The Cheshire Phoenix are a professional basketball team based in Ellesmere Port, United Kingdom. Founded in 1984, they are members of the British Basketball League and play their home games at the Cheshire Oaks Arena. From 1993 until 2015 the team was based in Chester, where they enjoyed their most success. Under previous ownership, the team was known as Cheshire Jets, but due to financial difficulties the franchise was withdrawn from the League in November 2012 and reformed as the Phoenix. The team's head coach is Ben Thomas.

Franchise history

Origin
The team was first formed from the ruins of the Ellesmere Port team, the St Saviour's in 1984. The team was initially named after their sponsors 'Motocraft Centre Ellesmere Port'. However, after the loss of their sponsor, they renamed themselves Ellesmere Port Jets.

The Jets were admitted to NBL Division 2 in 1986 and finished last in their first season, with just a single victory. Edging up to seventh in 1987–88, they then changed their name to Cheshire Jets, though still continuing to play in Ellesmere Port. They continued a steady mid-table development until, in 1991, they won the divisional title despite suffering five defeats. The same year, the Jets moved up into the BBL joining in with Britain's elite basketball teams. Later however, the arena in Ellesmere Port became unsuitable, and so in 1993 the Jets were forced to move to Chester, and into the Northgate Arena. The move was reflected in another name change to the Chester Jets.

The real turning point for the Jets came in 1996, when the application of the Bosman ruling to basketball resulted in the departure of many of the top English players to European clubs, and the BBL changed its eligibility rule to entitle teams to use five non-national players.

Trans-Atlantic recruitment by coach and co-owner Mike Burton resulted in a team which finished fifth in the League table in 1997. Subsequent seasons have seen their best-ever performances in 2002 (Northern Conference Champions) and 2003 (3rd in the re-unified League), and a string of successes in the BBL trophy (4-times winners, from 2001 to 2004), culminating in the League Championship in 2005.

On 7 April 2007, prior to the Jets' season finale at home to Guildford Heat, an 81–102 defeat, club owner and head coach Mike Burton announced that he would be retiring from the franchise at the end of the 2006–07 season. Burton's announcement, after 19 years at the helm, raised serious doubts of the clubs' future, with mounting debts and lack of financial backing. Shortly after the announcement, fans formed a committee to help save the club and received the backing of players including former Jet James Hamilton. Following a sponsorship deal agreed during the summer of 2007 with local firm BiG Storage to save the club and preserve their future, the Jets was renamed as the BiG Storage Cheshire Jets to cover the wider demographic of Cheshire county in line with BiG Storage's market coverage. When BiG Storage terminated the sponsorship, the managing director of the company arranged a successor sponsor; Cheshire West and Chester Council.

The club was plunged into chaos in November 2012 when, after only 7 games into the season, the British Basketball League withdrew the club's franchise from owner Haydn Cook after he notified them that he was going to cancel the players contracts and cancelled all future fixtures.

A statement from the BBL said: "The BBL have withdrawn the Cheshire franchise from its operating company with immediate effect.

"The decision follows an urgent review of the franchise following notification from the club that they were unable to fulfil their fixture this weekend. The BBL is currently exploring a number of options to ensure the continuation of the franchise. It is anticipated there will be a further announcement in the coming days." (Cheshire Chronicle)

The club had until the end of November to find £50,000 to preserve its status in top-flight basketball. Local businesses were found to donate money and become sponsors, thus saving the club and fulfilling its fixture list as planned.

Home arenas

Ellesmere Port Leisure Centre (1984–1993)
Northgate Arena (1993–2015)
Cheshire Oaks Arena (2015–present)

Logos

Season-by-season records

Notes:
From 1999–2002 the BBL operated a Conference system. 
DNQ denotes Did Not Qualify.
NYP denotes Not Yet Played.

Trophies

League
 NBL Division One Winners: 1990–91 1
 BBL Championship Winners: 2001–02, & 2004–05 2
 BBL Championship Runners Up: 2000–01 1

Playoffs
 BBL Championship Play Off Winners: 2001–02 1
 BBL Championship Play Off Runners Up: 2003–04, & 2004–05 2

Trophy
 BBL Trophy Winners: 2000–01, 2001–02, 2002–03, 2003–04, 2021–22 5
 BBL Trophy Runners Up: 1996–97, 2009–10 2

Cup
 National Cup Winners: 2001–02, 2017–18 2
 National Cup Runners Up: 2000–01, 2009–10 2

Players

Current roster

Notable players

Retired numbers

FIBA Hall of Famers

See also

Basketball in England
British Basketball League

References

External links
 

 
Basketball teams established in 1984
Sport in Cheshire
Basketball teams in England
British Basketball League teams
Sport in Chester
Ellesmere Port
1984 establishments in England